Ten ships of the Royal Navy have borne the name HMS Medusa, after the ancient Greek mythological figure Medusa:

  was a 50-gun fourth rate launched in 1785 and wrecked in 1798.
  was a 38-gun fifth-rate frigate launched in 1801. She was Nelson's flagship on his return to England at Harwich on 9 August, was present at the action of 5 October 1804 and was broken up in 1816.
HMS Medusa was to have been a 46-gun fifth rate. She was ordered in 1816, reordered in 1830 and cancelled in 1831.
  was a wooden paddle packet launched in 1838 and sold in 1872.
  was an iron paddle gunboat launched in 1839 and wrecked in 1853.
  was a  launched in 1888, on harbour service from 1910, sold in 1920 and resold in 1921.
She was purchased in 1914, before being launched in 1915.
HMS Medusa was an  monitor, previously named . She was renamed HMS Medusa in 1925, converted to a depot ship and renamed HMS Talbot in 1941, HMS Medway II in 1943 and back to HMS Medusa in 1944. She was sold in 1946 and broken up in 1947.
 was a harbour defence motor launch, launched in 1943 as ML 1387. She served in D-Day, was renamed BDB 76 in 1946, SDML 3516 in 1949 and Medusa in 1961. She was paid off in 1963, and is now a museum ship.

Notes

Sources

Royal Navy ship names